3D video coding is one of the processing stages required to manifest stereoscopic content into a home. There are three techniques which are used to achieve stereoscopic video:

 Color shifting (anaglyph)
 Pixel subsampling (side-by-side, checkerboard, quincunx)
 Enhanced video stream coding (2D+Delta, 2D+Metadata, 2D plus depth)

See also
 2D plus Delta
 2D-plus-depth
 Motion compensation
 Multiview Video Coding

Stereoscopy
Graphics file formats